The Philippine Women's University (PWU) is a tertiary education school which has its main campus in Manila, Philippines. An institution exclusive for girls from its inception until the 1970s, the PWU admits both women and men as its students.

PWU's basic education department is called the Jose Abad Santos Memorial School (PWU JASMS) and has two campuses in Manila and Quezon City.

History

Early years 
In 1919 during the American colonial era, the Philippine Women's University was established as the Philippine Women's College (PWC) by a group of Filipino women consisting of Clara Aragon, Concepcion Aragon, Francisca Tirona Benitez, Paz Marquez Benitez, Carolina Ocampo Palma, Mercedes Rivera and Socorro Marquez Zaballero with the assistance of Filipino lawyer José Abad Santos, who drafted the university's constitution and by-laws. It had an initial enrollment of 190 students.

The American colonial government granted the Philippine Women's College university status in 1932, and was renamed as the Philippine Women's University. It was the first university for women in Asia founded by Asians. From 1928 up to the outbreak of the World War II, Philippine Women's University introduced the following programs: Home Economics, Music and Fine Arts, Social Work, Nutrition, Pharmacy and Business. In 1938, a course in Social Civic training was incorporated into the curriculum. The academic programs were based on the founders' objectives to train Filipinas in civic responsibility.

Established families from all over the Philippines who could afford higher education sent their daughters to PWU. Most institutions offering higher education at that time were exclusively for young men, like PWU's neighbor, De La Salle College. Schools for women offering higher education were operated by secular or religious sisters of the Roman Catholic Church, including PWU's neighbors, Santa Isabel College, Assumption College, St. Paul College, Manila and St. Scholastica's College. There was also the Centro Escolar de Senoritas College which predated PWU by some 12 years, having been founded in 1907. The PWU had a more 'Americanized' curriculum than the former institution.

Second World War and afterward 
The Philippine Women's University survived the Japanese occupation of the Philippine islands of World War II from 1942 to 1945. For a time, classes at the PWU were held intermittently due to the extraordinary conditions imposed by the Japanese. The PWU campus, a building occupying an entire city block, was converted to a hospital, known as the Pagamutan ng Maynila.

The university sustained major damage during the war and barely survived the siege during the Battle of Manila in 1945. The school resumed its operations a few months prior the granting of independence to the Philippines by the United States on July 4, 1946.

The university opened to elementary and secondary education when it founded the Jose Abad Santos Memorial School (JASMS) which now has two campuses in Manila and Quezon City and is called PWU JASMS.

Outside Metro Manila
In less than 50 years since the university's founding, PWU opened similar campuses for women in the country bearing the Philippine Women's College name, such as in Iloilo City in the Visayas and Davao City in Mindanao (opened on June 8, 1953, and actively operating as 'Philippine Women's College of Davao' or PWC). In 1972, the Iloilo City Colleges (now the University of Iloilo) purchased the PWC of Iloilo campus in its Jaro District. They turned the buildings into the Don Benito Lopez Memorial Hospital. Fifteen years later, in 1987, Don Benito Lopez Memorial Hospital was acquired by the West Visayas State University. It became the WVSU Hospital, a 150-bed tertiary, teaching and training hospital.

PWU opened a satellite campus in Cebu City but it closed down. It was at the corner of Leon Kilat and Colon Streets. They also had a satellite campus in Cagayan de Oro, along Antonio Luna Extension, but was later closed and soon renamed "Professional World Academy".

The PWC in Davao City was granted autonomy from PWU and operates under a separate charter as a co-educational institution.

PWU started the Career Development and Continuing Education Center (CDCEC) in 1978 as a means to enable the benefits of a PWU education to reach other areas in the country. There are several CDCEC franchises in Calamba, Sta. Cruz, Baguio, Camarines Norte, Tarlac and Bulacan owned and operated by private individuals and groups.

Reform to a co-educational institution 
The university had its first male president in 1993 with the election of Jose Conrado Benitez who had a strategic plan to diversify and to use information technology to transcend distance and bring functional education to everyone.

In the 1970s, PWU started admission of male enrollees as students and became co-educational.
In 2003, Amelia Benitez Reyes became the eighth university president.
In 2009, the Board of Trustees appointed Alfredo Benitez Reyes as the chief executive officer.  As CEO, Reyes became the de facto head of the institution. Amelia B. Reyes retired then. 
In 2011, Jose Francisco Benitez became the ninth, and second male president of the PWU.

Issues with STI 
In 2011, PWU was involved in a joint venture plan to infuse much-needed capital from STI, an educational behemoth owned by Eusebio Tanco. The deal went sour in 2014 and a legal battle ensued when the Benitez family refused to accede to STI's plans to commercialize the PWU JASMS Quezon City campus. An amicable settlement was reached by the two parties in 2016 which saw STI stepping down from all involvement with PWU and JASMS in exchange for land owned by the Benitez family, which was used to pay back PWU's debts.

Notable alumni
 Hwang In-youp, South Korean actor, model and singer
 Boy Abunda, television host
 Jason Dy, Singer
 Wilfredo Alicdan, figurative artist
 Teddy Diaz, musician and composer
 Joseph Estrada, actor and politician; former president of the Philippines
 Guia Gomez, politician
 Enya Gonzalez, singer
 Leonor Orosa-Goquingco, National Artist for Dance
 Lucrecia Kasilag, composer and pianist
 Laarni Lozada, singer
 Imelda Marcos, politician and former First Lady; wife of Ferdinand Marcos
 Carmi Martin, actress
 Rosa Santos Munda, lawyer and educator
 Whilce Portacio, comic book writer and artist
 Cory Quirino, television host and author 
 Ruffa Gutierrez, actress and Miss World 2nd Princess 
 Armida Siguion-Reyna, singer and actress

Affiliations
PWU is a member institution of Philippine Association of College and Universities (PACU), Philippine Accrediting Association of Schools, Colleges and Universities (PAASCU), Philippine Association of Colleges and Universities Commission on Accreditation (PACUCOA) as well as the International Association of Universities and the International Association of University Presidents.

Sports
PWU is active in the Women's National Collegiate Athletics Association (WNCAA) and Women's Collegiate Sports Association (WCSA). The official school moniker is the PWU Patriots.

As of 2008:

Table Tennis
WCSA Champion (2006–2007 and 2007–2008)

Swimming
WNCAA 2nd Overall (2006–2007 and 2007–2008)
WCSA 2nd Overall (2006–2007 and 2007–2008)

Basketball
WCSA Champion (2008–2009)
WNCAA Champion [Division B] (2008–2009)
WNCAA 3rd Place [Division B] (2007–2008)
WCSA 2nd Place (2007–2008)

Futsal
WNCAA 4th Place (2007–2008)
WCSA Champion (2007–2008)

Volleyball
WNCAA
WCSA

Badminton
WNCAA
WCSA

Taekwondo
WNCAA
WCSA

Gallery

See also 
Universities and Colleges in the Philippines

References

External links

The Philippine Women's University Official Website
The Philippine Women's College of Davao - Official Website
 PWU @ WebCite GeoCities Archive

 
Universities and colleges in Manila
Distance education institutions based in the Philippines
Educational institutions established in 1919
Education in Malate, Manila
Universities and colleges in Quezon City
1919 establishments in the Philippines